Norjmaa is a 2014 Chinese film directed by Bayin.
Norjmaa won Best Film Award and Best Actress Award at 33rd Fajr International Film Festival (2015), Best Actress Award and Best Cinematographer Award at Yakutsk International Film Festival (2015), Best Actress Award at Golden Rooster Awards (2015).

References

External links
 

2014 films
Chinese historical drama films
2010s Mandarin-language films